Admiral Arthur Wartensleben Ewart (23 December 1862 – 18 November 1922) was a Royal Navy officer.

Ewart was the  second son of General Sir John Alexander Ewart and the younger brother of Lieutenant-General Sir John Spencer Ewart.

References 

1862 births
1922 deaths
Royal Navy admirals
Royal Navy admirals of World War I